The 2021 Alsco Uniforms 302 was the 27th stock car race of the 2021 NASCAR Xfinity Series, the 4th iteration of the event, and the first race of the playoffs and the Round of 12. The race was held on Saturday, September 25, 2021 in North Las Vegas, Nevada at Las Vegas Motor Speedway, a  permanent D-shaped oval racetrack. The race took 201 laps to complete. Josh Berry, in a dominating finish where his team, JR Motorsports finished 1-2-3, won the race after almost being involved in a wreck early in the race. Justin Allgaier and Noah Gragson would fill in the rest of the podium positions, finishing second and third, respectively.

Background 

Las Vegas Motor Speedway, located in Clark County, Nevada outside the Las Vegas city limits and about 15 miles northeast of the Las Vegas Strip, is a 1,200-acre (490 ha) complex of multiple tracks for motorsports racing. The complex is owned by Speedway Motorsports, Inc., which is headquartered in Charlotte, North Carolina.

Entry list 

*Driver changed to Josh Berry due to a leg injury Annett had suffered.

Qualifying 
Qualifying was determined by a qualifying metric system based on the last race, the 2021 Food City 300 and owner's points. As a result, Austin Cindric of Team Penske won the pole.

Race

Pre-race ceremonies 
In driver introductions, Matt Jaskol, Las Vegas native who was starting 34th would skydive out of a helicopter onto the track.

Race recap

Post-race driver comments

Race results 
Stage 1 Laps: 45

Stage 2 Laps: 45

Stage 3 Laps: 111

References 

2021 NASCAR Xfinity Series
NASCAR races at Las Vegas Motor Speedway
Alsco Uniforms 302
Alsco Uniforms 302